Cliffhanger is a 1993 American action thriller film directed and co-produced by Renny Harlin and co-written by and starring Sylvester Stallone alongside John Lithgow, Michael Rooker and Janine Turner. Based on a concept by climber John Long, the film follows Gabe (Stallone), a mountain climber who becomes embroiled in a heist of a U.S. Treasury plane flying through the Rocky Mountains. The film premiered at the 1993 Cannes Film Festival, and was released in the United States on May 28, 1993, by TriStar Pictures. It earned $255 million worldwide.

Plot 

Rangers Gabriel "Gabe" Walker and Jessie Deighan are dispatched to rescue their friend Hal Tucker and his girlfriend, Sarah, after Hal suffered a knee injury and stranded them on a peak in the Colorado Rockies. As they try to rescue Sarah, part of her harness breaks. Although Gabe is initially able to grab her, her gloved hand slips out and she falls to her death. Hal blames Gabe for Sarah's death and Gabe is overcome with guilt, taking an extended leave.

Eight months later, Gabe returns to the ranger station to gather his remaining possessions and persuade Jessie to leave with him. While there, they receive a distress call from a group of stranded climbers. Hal goes to locate the climbers and Jessie is able to persuade Gabe to help out. Hal remains bitter towards Gabe over Sarah's death, at one point threatening to push Gabe off a ledge. When they find the climbers, they discover the distress call was a fake and are taken prisoner by a ruthless gang of international thieves led by psychopathic former Military Intelligence operative Eric Qualen. The surviving thieves are the brutal Kynette, sadistic Delmar and pilot Kristel. Qualen, along with turncoat U.S. Treasury agent Richard Travers, were able to steal three suitcases full of uncirculated bills valuing over $100 million from a McDonnell Douglas DC-9 on a mid-air transfer to a Lockheed Jetstar. Their escape plan backfired when a supposedly dead FBI agent shoots and damages the hydraulics, sending their plane crashing into the mountain, and they now require Gabe and Hal's help to locate the cases with the help of beacon locators.

At gunpoint, Hal and Gabe lead them to the first case, located upwards on a steep rock face. Gabe is tethered and forced to climb up the face to reach the case, but when Qualen plans to have Gabe killed once he's got the case, Hal warns him not to come down. Before Delmar pulls him back and hold him at gunpoint, Qualen orders Kynette and one of the thieves try to yank him down, prompting Gabe to sever the rope. Qualen orders one of the thieves to open fire on Gabe, causing an avalanche that kills Holden, one of their members. When they see the money from the first case fluttering away, Qualen believes Gabe is dead, and orders Hal to lead them onward. Gabe races ahead to find Jessie at an abandoned cabin, recovering old mountaineering gear to reach the second case before Qualen does. Night falls on the mountain and by the time Qualen arrives, Gabe and Jessie have emptied the case and left only a single bill with the taunting message "Want to trade?" on it. Qualen orders his men to split up, one of whom, Ryan, spots Gabe and Jessie before attempting to shoot them; however, Gabe blinds him, dropping the assault rifle before tackling the man down an snowy incline. After sending Ryan over the cliff before using a tool to prevent following off, both groups take shelter: of them, Gabe and Jessie burn the money for warmth and fall asleep.
 
When morning breaks, Gabe and Jessie resolve to beat Qualen to the last case. Elsewhere, when Hal sees two friends, Evan and Brett, he warns them away before Qualen orders his men to open fire. Brett is killed while Evan is wounded, though he manages to run off the mountain and parachute to safety. Frank, having not heard from Gabe or the others, scouts the mountain in the helicopter, spots Evan's parachute, and is able to get him to safety while contacting the authorities. Upon Gabe impaling Kynette on a stalactite in a cavern after luring him, he attempts to call for help from Frank, their rescue helicopter pilot, on one of the mercenaries' radios, but Hal alerts him to explosives Qualen has rigged above them on the mountain. Gabe and Jessie escape the falling debris in time. Meanwhile, the mercenaries flag down Frank in the helicopter, but by the time he realizes it's a trap it is too late and he is fatally shot by Delmar. While hugging Frank's body, Hal discreetly grabs Frank's knife. As the mercenaries split up to look for the last case, Hal is able to use the knife to stab Delmar, kill him with his own shotgun, and escape. Travers sees Gabe and gives chase. While on the surface of a frozen river, Travers observes Gabe under the ice and tries to kill him, but Gabe uses his bolt gun to shoot Travers and his lifeless body is carried away by the river current. 

However, at the same time, Qualen takes Jessie hostage when she waves down the helicopter, believing that Frank was flying it: Qualen tells Gabe and Hal over the radio that he is holding Jessie captive on board the helicopter, demanding Gabe and Hal surrender the money from the third case at a high elevated rendezvous point and threatens to kill her should they refuse to cooperate. Gabe and Hal agree, and they meet at a cliffside bridge; however, Qualen tries to challenge Gabe into throwing the case into the helicopter, but when he also threatens to kill Jessie again, Gabe orders Qualen to free her at a safe distance away from the cliff. Qualen reluctantly agrees, and uses a winch to lower Jessie to the ground; once Jessie is safely down, however, Gabe throws the bag of money into the helicopter's rotors, shredding the money. Enraged, Qualen attempts to use the helicopter to kill Gabe, but Gabe has used the winch cable to tether the helicopter to a steel ladder up the cliff face; Hal arrives and helps by shooting down the helicopter. The ladder snaps and leaves Gabe and Qualen atop the wreckage of the helicopter hanging by the cable: Gabe fights Qualen and manages to climb to safety as the wreckage snaps off the cable and falls to the bottom of the mountain, killing Qualen. Gabe reunites with Jessie and Hal as they are found by Treasury agents led by Walter Wright in a helicopter, arranging to send a rescue helicopter as the trio are seen sitting on top of a mountain peak, reminiscent of Gabe, Hal, and Sarah at the beginning.

Cast

Production

Development and writing 
Carolco Pictures had originally signed Sylvester Stallone to appear opposite John Candy in a comedy about feuding neighbors titled Bartholomew Vs. Neff, which was going to be written and directed by John Hughes. When that project was dropped, Stallone became involved in two other Carolco projects. 

The first one was the futuristic science-fiction horror film Isobar, which was about a genetically-created monster who breaks free on a high-speed runaway train: between 1987, when Carolco first bought the original script by Jim Uhls for $400,000, and 1991, directors Ridley Scott and Roland Emmerich were each at different points in time attached to direct the film which would have had a $90 million budget with Stallone and Kim Basinger playing the main roles; however, due to disagreements between them and Carolco and producer Joel Silver about the script changes and lack of artistic freedom, both Scott and Emmerich gave up on the project, which in the end was cancelled.

The second Carolco project in which Stallone was involved was an action disaster thriller entitled Gale Force, described as "Die Hard in a hurricane", which Renny Harlin was going to direct, and in which Stallone would play an ex-Navy SEAL who has to fight against a group of modern pirates who attack a coastal town during a large, catastrophic hurricane. The first version of the script for the film was written by David Chappe in 1984, who then wrote six more drafts between 1987 and 1989, and after his final draft received some praise and following the bidding war between several studios for it in 1989, Carolco bought his final draft for $500,000, with a promise of an additional $200,000 if the movie were made. Harlin was paid $3 million for directing the film, but because his contract also gave him full control of the project, he demanded many re-writes of the script to, amongst other things, increase the number of action sequences and make them bigger. Between 1990 and 1991 while they were working on the project, Carolco spent over $4 million on all the different screenwriters and versions of the script. One of the screenwriters who worked on it, Joe Eszterhas, was paid $500,000 to write his version. He re-wrote it as an erotic thriller, similar to his previous screenplays, so it was rejected.

Carolco, believing the intended $40 million budget would be too big, and unable to figure out how to make special effects for the film, cancelled that project two weeks before production was supposed to begin; but Harlin still kept his $3 million, and he and Stallone and everyone else involved in it then moved on to Cliffhanger, another Carolco project, which had a budget of $70 million, almost double that of Gale Force.

Before production began, Stallone rewrote Michael France's script: his work changed the film significantly enough that Carolco petitioned the Writers Guild of America for him to get credit.

Half of the film's budget was provided by TriStar Pictures in exchange for complete distribution rights in North America, Mexico, Australia, New Zealand, Germany, and France. Other funding was provided by Rizzoli-Corriere della Sera, Le Studio Canal+, and Pioneer Electric Corporation. The financing arrangement was the result of Carolco's serious debt issues, and as a result, the studio would ultimately receive very little of the box office gross. During principal photography, production was shut down twice when Carolco could not afford to pay the crew; the movie went $40 million over budget. Stallone reportedly had to forego $2 million of his $15 million salary as a result.

Filming 
The large majority of the film's scenes were shot in the Dolomites in Cortina d'Ampezzo, Italy. For example, the bridge scene was shot on Monte Cristallo in the via ferrata VF Ivano Dibona, which was reconstructed immediately after the movie. The climbing was mostly on the Tofane cliffs, and in some scenes toward the end of the movie the audience clearly sees the three Tofane, the Croda da Lago, and the town of Cortina; the location of this is on top of Mount Faloria, at the arrival of the funivia Faloria. In other scenes are the sentiero ferrato Astaldi, over the Rifugio Dibona. The small house has been constructed on the sand of the river Boite, in Fiames, close to the heliport. Some filming took place in Durango, Colorado. The credits of the film also thank the Ute Tribe for filming in the Ute Mountain reservation.

Cliffhanger is in the Guinness Book of World Records for the costliest aerial stunt ever performed.

The principal climbing doubles were Ron Kauk and Wolfgang Güllich. Kauk performed as Stallone's climbing double after Güllich died in a car accident in 1992. The doubles filled in for Stallone on most of the climbing scenes due to the actor's fear of heights; an injury to Stallone's hand, reported to have occurred on one of the cliffs, actually occurred on a soundstage.

When asked about the director's cut, Stallone explained that "the director's cut was met with a lot of disapproval at the screening and received some alarmingly low scores. Mainly because the stunts were absurdly overblown. For example, the average man can jump maybe twelve feet across a gorge, and the stunts had me leaping maybe three hundred feet or more, so situations like that had to be pared down and still then were fairly extreme...so you’re probably better off with this cut. By the way, the second unit crew that filmed the majority of the action was extraordinary."

Music 

The orchestral score to Cliffhanger was composed by film score veteran Trevor Jones with the National Philharmonic Orchestra. In his review for the Cliffhanger soundtrack, Filmtracks.com reviewer Christian Clemmensen mentioned its similarities to Jones' previous work on The Last of the Mohicans, stating: "with Cliffhanger would come a title theme strikingly similar to that of Last of the Mohicans, possibly too reminiscent in fact for some listeners to tolerate."  However, his review was still positive, giving the Cliffhanger score four out of a possible five stars, concluding, "No matter your view of whether or not composers should recycle their own material, Jones' main identity for Cliffhanger stands on its own as a remarkable piece, and an often enjoyable action underscore will maintain your interest in between the theme's statements." The soundtrack has been released twice; through Scotti Bros./BMG Music on 23 May 1993 and an extended version through Intrada Records on 21 February 2011.

Release

Cut version
For its British cinema release, the film was cut by over a minute, then by a further 16 seconds on video and DVD to gain a '15' certificate. Chief victim was the scene in which Delmar beats up Tucker, but other cuts included aggressive strong language and other moments of violence. However, the 2008 DVD release was given a '15' with no cuts made.

Home media 
Cliffhanger was released via DVD on November 26, 1997 and re-released for the Collector's Edition on June 13, 2000 by Columbia TriStar Home Video. The film on Blu-ray was released first in United Kingdom on August 4, 2008, Australia and Mexico in 2009 by Optimum Home Entertainment and Universal Studios Home Entertainment under the StudioCanal banner, and in the United States on January 12, 2010, and on 4K UltraHD Blu-ray on 15 January 2019. The film was re-released on Blu-ray in Australia and United Kingdom only from 2018 to 2019 for the film's 25th anniversary under the Classics Remastered and Brand New Restoration. The film was re-released with Last Action Hero on Blu-ray  2-Movie Collection on November 2, 2021.

Reception

Box office 
The film was a box office hit grossing $255 million worldwide. The film grossed $84 million in the United States and Canada, $14 million in the United Kingdom and $13 million in Germany. It spent 11 consecutive weeks at the top of the Japanese box office.

Critical response 
On Rotten Tomatoes the film has an approval rating of 67% based on 55 reviews, with an average rating of 6.2/10. The website's critical consensus reads, "While it can't escape comparisons to the movies it borrows from, Cliffhanger is a tense, action-packed thriller and a showcase for the talents that made Sylvester Stallone a star." On Metacritic the film has a score of 60 out of 100 based on reviews from 16 critics. Audiences polled by CinemaScore gave the film an average grade of "B" on an A+ to F scale.

The film was screened out of competition at the 1993 Cannes Film Festival. It was nominated for three Academy Awards: Best Sound (Michael Minkler, Bob Beemer, and Tim Cooney), Best Sound Effects Editing (Gregg Baxter), and Best Visual Effects, all losing to Jurassic Park.

It was nominated for Worst Picture, Worst Supporting Actor (John Lithgow), Worst Supporting Actress (Janine Turner), and Worst Screenplay at the 14th Golden Raspberry Awards. Roger Ebert gave the film 3 out of 4 stars. Although most people enjoyed Lithgow's performance, he was criticized for his inauthentic-sounding English accent, especially when next to native English actors Fairbrass and Goodall.

Michael Benge of Climbing magazine was critical of the film's unrealistic portrayal of rock climbing, including the fictional gun which fires pitons directly into rock.

Other media

Novelization 
A novelization based on the film by Jeff Rovin titled Cliffhanger, was released in 1993.

Video game  
A video game based on the film of the same name was released via numerous game consoles on November 17, 1993.

In popular culture 
The scene where Hal's girlfriend Sarah falls to her death was spoofed in the films Ace Ventura: When Nature Calls and Spy Hard.

Cancelled sequel and potential remake 
Around 1994, TriStar Pictures planned to make a sequel of the film titled The Dam (or Cliffhanger 2: The Dam), which would have Stallone's character Gabe Walker fighting against terrorists who took over Hoover Dam, but it never went beyond development stage. In 2008, once again there were plans to make this sequel, and even Stallone was interested, but it was cancelled.

In May 2009, it was announced that StudioCanal would be overseeing a remake of Cliffhanger. Neal H. Moritz was set to produce, with filming due to begin in 2010. In May 2014, Joe Gazzam was set to write the script for the film.

In 2015 on his official Instagram, Stallone stated he would love to make a sequel to Cliffhanger, which puts doubt on whether a reboot will actually happen. In 2019, a female-fronted ‘Cliffhanger’ reboot was announced, written by Sascha Penn, to be directed by Ana Lily Amirpour and Jason Momoa in talks to cameo.

See also 
 Survival film

References

External links 

 
 
 
 
 
 
 
 

1993 films
1993 action thriller films
1990s American films
1990s action adventure films
1990s heist films
American heist films
1990s English-language films
American action adventure films
American action thriller films
Avalanches in film
Carolco Pictures films
Films about terrorism in the United States
Films directed by Renny Harlin
Films scored by Trevor Jones
Films set in Colorado
Films shot in Colorado
Films shot in Italy
Films with screenplays by Michael France
Films with screenplays by Sylvester Stallone
Mountaineering films
StudioCanal films
TriStar Pictures films